Paolo de Matteis (also known as Paolo de' Matteis; 9 February 1662 – 26 January 1728) was an Italian painter.

Biography
He was born in Piano Vetrale, a hamlet of Orria, in the current Province of Salerno, and died in Naples. He trained with Francesco di Maria in Naples, then with Luca Giordano. He served in the employ of the Spanish Viceroy of Naples. From 1702 to 1705, de' Matteis worked in Paris, Calabria, and Genoa. In Genoa, he painted an Immaculate Conception with St. Jerome Appearing to St. Sevrio.

Returning to Naples, he painted decorative schemes for Neapolitan churches, including the vault of the chapel of San Ignatius in the church of Gesù Nuovo in Naples. He also painted an Assumption of the Virgin for the Abbey at Monte Cassino. Between 1723 and 1725, de' Matteis lived in Rome, where he received a commission from Pope Innocent XIII.

He had as pupils Filippo Falciatore, Francesco Peresi, and members of the Sarnelli family including Francesco, Gennaro, Giovanni, and Antonio Sarnelli. Others who were his pupils were Giuseppe Mastroleo, Giovanni Pandozzi, Michelangelo Buonocore, Domenico Guarino, Antonio Fumo and Nicola de Filippis.

Gallery

See also
 Santa Maria di Montesanto, Naples, for one of his works
 In 1996, the United States Postal Service issued a Christmas stamp based on his Adoration of the Shepherds.

References
  Artnet biography from Grove encyclopedia of Art.
 Getty Museum biography.

External links

1662 births
1728 deaths
People from the Province of Salerno
17th-century Italian painters
Italian male painters
18th-century Italian painters
Painters from Naples
Italian Baroque painters
18th-century Italian male artists